Kim-Alice Grajdek (born 30 March 1991) is a German tennis player.

Grajdek has won one singles and eight doubles titles on the ITF tour in her career. On 21 November 2011, she reached her best singles ranking of world number 405. On 5 August 2013, she peaked at world number 332 in the doubles rankings.

ITF finals (9–16)

Singles (1–1)

Doubles (8–15)

External links 

 
 

1991 births
Living people
People from Hanover Region
German female tennis players
Tennis people from Lower Saxony